The Soccer NSW 1999 season was the 43rd season of football in New South Wales since the formation of NSW Federation of Soccer Clubs in 1957. It was the eighth time the premier division was named the "Super League" and the second division was named "Division 1". There were 24 teams competing across both divisions, with 12 teams in each league.

Competitions

1999 Super League

The 1999 Super League season was played over 22 rounds, with the regular season from February to July 1999.

League table

Finals

1999 NSW Division One

The 1999 NSW Division One season was played over 22 rounds, with the regular season starting in March.

League table

Finals
Results unknown. Penrith Panthers won and were promoted for next season.

References

1999 in Australian soccer